Dag Halfdan Usterud (born 3 December 1961) is a Norwegian sailor. He was born in Porsgrunn. He participated at the 1984 Summer Olympics in Los Angeles, where he placed fifth in the Soling class, together with Børre Skui and Stein Lund Halvorsen.

References

External links
 

1961 births
Living people
Sportspeople from Porsgrunn
Norwegian male sailors (sport)
Olympic sailors of Norway
Sailors at the 1984 Summer Olympics – Soling